Primera División de México (Mexican First Division) Invierno 2000 is a Mexican football tournament - one of two short tournaments that take up the entire year to determine the champion(s) of Mexican football. It began on Saturday, July 29, 2000, and ran until November 18, when the regular season ended. Irapuato was promoted to the Primera División de México thus, Toros Neza was relegated to the Primera División A. Morelia defeated Toluca in the final and were crowned Champions for the first, and to date, the only time.

Overview

Final Standings (groups)

League table

Results

Top goalscorers 
Players sorted first by goals scored, then by last name. Only regular season goals listed.

Source: MedioTiempo

Playoffs

Repechage

Morelia won 7–3 on aggregate.

Bracket

Quarterfinals

4–4 on aggregate. Toluca advanced for being the higher seeded team.

Atlas won 2–1 on aggregate.

Morelia won 2–1 on aggregate.

Santos Laguna won 4–3 on aggregate.

Semifinals

Toluca won 6–4 on aggregate.

Morelia won 3–2 on aggregate.

Finals

3–3 on aggregate. Morelia won 5–4 on penalty kicks.

External links
 Mediotiempo.com (where information was obtained)

Mexico
2000–01 in Mexican football
2000B